Geoffrey Howard Williams  (18 November 1930 – 20 July 2020) was an Australian rules footballer for Geelong in the Victorian Football League (VFL).

A half-back flanker, he played in Geelong's 1952 premiership team and won the club's best and fairest award in 1952 and 1955.

He and his wife Joan had four children. He was awarded the Medal of the Order of Australia in the 2016 Australia Day honours for services "to Australian rules football, and to the community of Geelong".

References

External links
 
 

Geelong Football Club players
Geelong Football Club Premiership players
Carji Greeves Medal winners
Yarraville Football Club players
Warragul Football Club players
Australian rules footballers from Victoria (Australia)
1930 births
2020 deaths
Recipients of the Medal of the Order of Australia
One-time VFL/AFL Premiership players